Christopher French could refer to: 

Christopher French (theologian) (fl. c. 1650–c.1713), Irish professor of divinity
Chris French (Christopher Charles French) (born 1956), British psychologist
Christopher French (judge) (1925-2003), British jurist
Christopher French (admiral), American naval officer

See also
Christine French, New Zealand jurist
Christopher France (disambiguation)